Klemmia is a genus of gastropods belonging to the family Spelaeodiscidae.

The species of this genus are found in the Balkans.

Species:
Klemmia magnicosta 
Klemmia sinistrorsa

References

 Gittenberger, E. (1969). Beiträge zur Kenntnis der Pupillacea. I. Die Spelaeodiscinae. Zoologische Mededelingen, 43 (22): 287-306, pl. 1. Leiden
 Bank, R. A. (2017). Classification of the Recent terrestrial Gastropoda of the World. Last update: July 16th, 2017
 Gittenberger, E. (1975). Beiträge zur Kenntnis der Pupillacea. V. Die Spelaeodiscinae, erster Nachtrag. Zoologische Mededelingen, 48 (23): 263-277, plates 1-3. Leiden.

Spelaeodiscidae